Wong Tung Jim, A.S.C. (August 28, 1899 – July 12, 1976), known professionally as James Wong Howe (Houghto), was a Chinese-born American cinematographer who worked on over 130 films. During the 1930s and 1940s, he was one of the most sought after cinematographers in Hollywood due to his innovative filming techniques. Howe was known as a master of the use of shadow and one of the first to use deep-focus cinematography, in which both foreground and distant planes remain in focus. 

Born in Canton (Taishan), China, Howe immigrated to the United States at age five and grew up in Washington. He was a professional boxer during his teenage years, and later began his career in the film industry as an assistant to Cecil B. DeMille. Howe pioneered the use of wide-angle lenses and low-key lighting, as well as the use of the crab dolly.

Despite the success of his professional life, Howe faced significant racial discrimination in his private life. He became an American citizen only after the repeal of the Chinese Exclusion Act in 1943, and due to anti-miscegenation laws, his marriage to a white woman was not legally recognized in the United States until 1948.

Howe earned 10 nominations for the Academy Award for Best Cinematography, winning twice for The Rose Tattoo (1955) and Hud (1963). He also received Oscar nominations for Algiers (1938), Abe Lincoln in Illinois (1940), Kings Row (1942), The North Star (1943), Air Force (1943),  The Old Man and the Sea (1958), Seconds (1966), and Funny Lady (1975). He was selected as one of the 10 most influential cinematographers in a survey of the members of the International Cinematographers Guild.

Career

Background
Howe was born Wong Tung Jim in Taishan, Canton Province, China in 1899. His father Wong Howe moved to America that year to work on the Northern Pacific Railway and in 1904 sent for his family. The Howes settled in Pasco, Washington, where they owned a general store. A Brownie camera, said to have been bought at Pasco Drug (a now-closed city landmark) when he was a child, sparked an early interest in photography.

After his father's death, the teenaged Howe moved to Oregon to live with his uncle and briefly considered (1915–16) a career as a bantamweight boxer. After compiling a record of 5 wins, 2 losses and a draw, Howe moved to the San Francisco Bay Area in hopes of attending aviation school but ran out of money and went south to Los Angeles. Once there, Howe took several odd jobs, including work as a commercial photographer's delivery boy and as a busboy at the Beverly Hills Hotel.

After a chance encounter with a former boxing colleague who was photographing a Mack Sennett short on the streets of Los Angeles, Howe approached cinematographer Alvin Wyckoff and landed a low-level job in the film lab at Famous Players-Lasky Studios. Soon thereafter he was called to the set of The Little American to act as an extra clapper boy, which brought him into contact with silent film director Cecil B. DeMille in 1917. Amused by the sight of the diminutive Asian holding the slate with a large cigar in his mouth, DeMille kept Howe on and launched his career as a camera assistant. To earn additional money, Howe took publicity stills for Hollywood stars.

Silent film

One of those still photographs launched Howe's career as a cinematographer when he stumbled across a means of making silent film star Mary Miles Minter's eyes look darker by photographing her while she was looking at a dark surface. Minter requested that Howe be first cameraman, that is director of photography, on her next feature, and Howe shot Minter's closeups for Drums of Fate by placing black velvet in a large frame around the camera. Throughout his career, Howe retained a reputation for making actresses look their best through lighting alone and seldom resorted to using gauze or other diffusion over the lens to soften their features. Howe worked steadily as a cinematographer from 1923 until the end of the era of silent film.

In 1928, Howe was in China shooting backgrounds for a movie he hoped to direct. The project he was working on was never completed (although some of the footage was used in Shanghai Express), and when he returned to Hollywood, he discovered that the "talkies" had largely supplanted silent productions. With no experience in that medium, Howe could not find work. To reestablish himself, Howe first co-financed a Japanese-language feature shot in Southern California entitled Chijiku wo mawasuru chikara (The Force that Turns the Earth around its Axis), which he also photographed and co-directed. When that film failed to find an audience in California's nisei communities or Japan, Howe shot the low-budget feature Today for no salary. Finally, director/producer Howard Hawks, whom he had met on The Little American, hired him for The Criminal Code and then director William K. Howard selected him to be the cinematographer on Transatlantic.

Sound film and the war years
Howe's innovative work on Transatlantic reestablished him as one of the leading cinematographers in Hollywood, and he worked continuously through the 1930s and 1940s, generally on several movies per year. Howe gained a reputation as a perfectionist who could be difficult to work with, often overruling and even berating other members of the film crew. In a 1945 issue of The Screen Writer, Howe stated his views of a cameraman's responsibility, writing in The Cameraman Talks Back that 
"[t]he cameraman confers with the director on: (a) the composition of shots for action, since some scenes require definite composition for their best dramatic effect, while others require the utmost fluidity, or freedom from any strict definition or stylization; (b) atmosphere; (c) the dramatic mood of the story, which they plan together from beginning to end; (d) the action of the piece." Howe's broad view of a cinematographer's responsibilities reflected those established for first cameramen in silent films and continued through the studio era where most directors were also contract employees mainly in charge of actor performances.

Howe was nominated for an Academy Award in 1944 in the "Best Cinematography: Black-and-White" category for his work on the movie Air Force, a nomination he shared with Elmer Dyer, A.S.C., and Charles A. Marshall.

In the early 1930s, while at MGM, Howe, who had generally been billed as "James Howe", began listing his name in film credits as "James Wong Howe". Over the course of his career, he was also credited as "James How", "Jimmie Howe", and "James Wong How." Often publicized as a Chinese cameraman, Howe was prevented from becoming a U.S. citizen until the repeal of the Chinese Exclusion Act in 1943.
Prior to World War II, Howe met his future wife, novelist Sanora Babb, whom he married in 1937 in Paris.  Due to anti-miscegenation laws, the marriage would not be legally recognized in the United States until 1948. Babb died in 2005, aged 98.

Post-war work
After the end of World War II, Howe's long-term contract with Warner Bros., lapsed, and he visited China to work on a documentary about rickshaw boys. When he returned Howe found himself gray-listed. While never a Communist, Howe was named in testimony as a sympathizer. Howe and his wife Sanora Babb, who had been a member of the Communist Party, moved to Mexico for a time; Howe was cinematographer for the RKO movie Mr. Blandings Builds His Dream House (1948) starring Cary Grant, Myrna Loy and Melvyn Douglas. Howe had trouble finding employment until writer/director Samuel Fuller hired him to shoot The Baron of Arizona released in 1950. 

Again reestablished, Howe's camerawork continued to be highly regarded. In 1949 he shot tests and was hired for a never made comeback film starring Greta Garbo (a screen adaptation of Balzac's La Duchesse de Langeais). In 1956, Howe won his first Academy Award for The Rose Tattoo. The film's director Daniel Mann originally had been a stage director and later stated that he gave Howe control over almost all decisions about the filming other than those regarding the actors and dialogue. In Sweet Smell of Success (1957), Howe worked with director Alexander Mackendrick to give the black-and-white film a sharp-edged look reminiscent of New York tabloid photography such as that taken by Arthur "Weegee" Fellig. During the 1950s, Howe directed his only English-language feature films, Invisible Avenger, one of many film adaptations of The Shadow, and Go Man Go, a movie about the Harlem Globetrotters. Neither was a critical or commercial success. In 1961 Howe directed episodes of Checkmate and 87th Precinct, then returned to cinematography.

Later life and work
Howe's best known work was almost entirely in black and white. His two Academy Awards both came during the period when Best Cinematography Oscars were awarded separately for color and black-and-white films. However, he successfully made the transition to color films and earned his first Academy Award nomination for a color film in 1958 for  The Old Man and the Sea. He won his second Academy Award for 1963's Hud. His cinematography remained inventive during his later career. For instance, his use of fish-eye and wide-angle lenses in Seconds (1966) helped give an eerie tension to director John Frankenheimer's science fiction movie.

During the mid to late 1960s, he taught cinematography at UCLA's Film School. Some of his students include Dean Cundey, Stephen H. Burum, and Alex Funke. Howe would take a minimal set and teach how to achieve a particular mood and style with just lighting. Cundey said, "it was my most valuable class I took in film school" and it changed his career direction to cinematography.

After working on The Molly Maguires (1970), Howe's health began to fail, and he entered semi-retirement. In 1974, he was well enough to be selected as a replacement cinematographer for Funny Lady. He collapsed during the filming; American Society of Cinematographers president Ernest Laszlo filled in for Howe while he was recovering in the hospital. Funny Lady earned Howe his tenth and final Oscar nomination. Three documentaries were made about Howe during the last two decades of his life.

Association of Asian Pacific American Artists created the James Wong Howe Award in his honor. Past winners of "The Jimmy" have included Arthur Dong, Genny Lim, and Jude Narita.

Personal life

Howe met his wife, a white woman named Sanora Babb, before World War II. They traveled to Paris in 1937 to marry, but their marriage was not recognized by the state of California until 1948, after the law banning interracial marriage was abolished.  Due to the ban, the "morals clause" in Howe's studio contracts prohibited him from publicly acknowledging his marriage to Babb. They would not cohabit due to his traditional Chinese views, so they had separate apartments in the same building.

During the early years of the House Un-American Activities Committee hearings, Babb was blacklisted due to supposedly having Communist ties from her marriage to Howe; she moved to Mexico City to protect the "graylisted" Howe from racial harassment.

Howe raised his godson, producer and director Martin Fong after Fong arrived in the United States.

He is buried at Pierce Bros. Westwood Memorial Park in Los Angeles.

Technical innovations
Howe's earliest discovery was the use of black velvet to make blue eyes show up better on the orthochromatic film stock in use until the early 1920s. Orthochromatic film was "blue blind"; it was sensitive to blue and green light, which showed as white on the developed film. Reds and yellows were darkened.  Faced with the problem of actors' eyes appearing washed out or even stark white on film, Howe developed a technique of mounting a frame swathed with black velvet around his camera so that the reflections darkened the actors' eyes enough for them to appear more natural in the developed film.

Howe earned the nickname "Low-Key Howe" because of his penchant for dramatic lighting and deep shadows, a technique that came to be associated with film noir. Later in his career, as film-stocks became faster and more sensitive, Howe continued to experiment with his photography and lighting techniques, such as shooting one scene in The Molly Maguires solely by candlelight.

Howe also was known for his use of unusual lenses, film stocks, and shooting techniques. For the 1927 film The Rough Riders, Howe created an early version of a crab dolly, a form of camera dolly with four independent wheels and a movable arm to which the camera is attached. For the boxing scenes of Body and Soul (1947), he entered the boxing ring on roller-skates, carrying an early hand-held camera. Picnic (1955) features a very early example of the helicopter shot, filmed by the second-unit cinematographer, Haskell Wexler, and planned by Wexler and Howe.

Howe was the first minority cinematographer admitted to the ASC, and mentored other minority cinematographers, such as John Alonzo, who shot Chinatown and many other productions in the 1970s, 1980s, and 1990s. Alonzo credited Howe with giving him his big break on the film Seconds as a camera operator, doing hand-held sequences during the wild party scenes with Rock Hudson. Alonzo became known for his hand-held technique.

Howe also shot The Outrage, a remake of Rashomon. During the chase scenes through the woods, Howe had the actors run around him in a circle, which when filmed, looks like a chase. Alonzo used this technique in Sounder, in the wooded chase sequence.

Although the innovation of deep focus cinematography is usually associated with Gregg Toland, Howe used it in his first sound film, Transatlantic, 10 years before Toland used the technique in Citizen Kane. For deep focus, the cinematographer narrows the aperture of the camera lens, and floods the set with light, so that elements in both the foreground and background remain in sharp focus. The technique requires highly sensitive film and was difficult to achieve with early film stocks. Along with Toland and Arthur Edeson, Howe was among the earliest cinematographers to use it successfully.

Frequent collaborators

 Herbert Brenon
 John Cromwell
 Victor Fleming
 Samuel Fuller
 Howard Hawks
 William K. Howard
 Charles Maigne
 Mary Miles Minter
 Paul Newman
 Sidney Olcott
 Martin Ritt
 David O. Selznick
 W. S. Van Dyke
 Raoul Walsh

Filmography

 Drums of Fate (1923)
 The Trail of the Lonesome Pine (1923)
 The Woman With Four Faces (1923)
 To the Last Man (1923)
 The Spanish Dancer (1923)
 The Call of the Canyon (1923)
 The Breaking Point (1924)
 The Alaskan (1924)
 Peter Pan (1924)
 The Charmer (1925)
 Not So Long Ago (1925)
 The Best People (1925)
 The King on Main Street (1925)
 Padlocked (1926)
 Sea Horses (1926)
 Mantrap (1926)
 The Rough Riders (1927)
 Sorrell and Son (1927)
 Laugh, Clown, Laugh (1928)
 The Perfect Crime (1928)
 Desert Nights (1929)
 The Rescue (1929)
 The Criminal Code (1931)
 Transatlantic (1931)
 Surrender (1931)
 The Yellow Ticket (1931)
 Man About Town (1932)
 The Power and the Glory (1933)
 Baby Face (1933)
 Manhattan Melodrama (1934)
 The Thin Man (1934)
 Stamboul Quest (1934)
 Mark of the Vampire (1935)
 The Flame Within (1935)
 O'Shaughnessy's Boy (1935)
 Three Live Ghosts (1936)
 Fire Over England (1937)
 The Prisoner of Zenda (1937)
 The Adventures of Tom Sawyer (1938)
 Algiers (1938)
 They Made Me a Criminal (1939)
 The Oklahoma Kid (1939)
 Daughters Courageous (1939)
 Dust Be My Destiny (1939)
 Fantasia (1940, uncredited for Philadelphia Orchestra sequences)
 Abe Lincoln in Illinois (1940)
 The Strawberry Blonde (1941)
 Shining Victory (1941)
 Out of the Fog (1941)
 Navy Blues (1941)
 Kings Row (1942)
 Yankee Doodle Dandy (1942)
 Air Force (1943)
 Hangmen Also Die (1943)
 The North Star (1943)
 Passage to Marseille (1944)
 Objective, Burma! (1945)
 Confidential Agent (1945)
 My Reputation (1946)
 Pursued (1947)
 Body and Soul (1947)
 Mr. Blandings Builds His Dream House (1948)
 The Baron of Arizona (1950)
 The Eagle and the Hawk (1950)
 He Ran All the Way (1951)
 Main Street to Broadway (1953)
 Jennifer (1953)
 Go,Man,Go! (1954)
 Picnic (1955)
 The Rose Tattoo (1955)
 Sweet Smell of Success (1957)
 Bell, Book and Candle (1958)
 Hud (1963)
 The Outrage (1964)
 The Glory Guys (1965) 
 This Property Is Condemned (1966)
 Seconds (1966)
 Hombre (1967)
 The Heart Is a Lonely Hunter (1968)
 The Molly Maguires (1970)
 Funny Lady (1975)

As director
Invisible Avenger (1958)
Go Man Go (1954)

Awards and nominations

References

Further reading

 Higham, Charles (1970). Hollywood Cameramen. London: Thames & Hudson. 
 Rainsberger, Todd (1981). James Wong Howe Cinematographer. London: The Tantivy Press. 
 Silver, Alain (2011). James Wong Howe The Camera Eye. Santa Monica: Pendragon. 
  (documentary)

External links

"The Camera Talks Back" by James Wong Howe
"Lighting" by James Wong Howe, Cinematographic Annual, Vol. 2 (1931) pp. 47–59
James Wong Howe Talk at 1974 San Francisco International Film Festival (audio only)
James Wong Howe papers, Margaret Herrick Library, Academy of Motion Picture Arts and Sciences
Selected Bibliography on James Wong Howe at the Smithsonian Institution Libraries
Photographs of San Francisco's Chinatown by James Wong Howe (1944), The Bancroft Library
James Wong Howe's Google Doodle
James Wong Howe: A Relative's Perspective by Richard Francis James Lee

1899 births
1976 deaths
American cinematographers
American film directors of Chinese descent
Best Cinematographer Academy Award winners
Burials at Westwood Village Memorial Park Cemetery
Chinese emigrants to the United States
Chinese cinematographers
People from Pasco, Washington
People from Taishan, Guangdong
Film directors from Washington (state)